The Centre for Yiddishkeit in The Hague (Dutch: Centrum voor Haagse Jiddisjkeit; CHAJ) is a non-profit organization promoting Jewish culture, identity, education and heritage in the Netherlands and The Hague. CHAJ has Israel-related programming. CHAJ also functions as a Jewish community centre for the Jewish community of The Hague.

Activities
Chaj also holds Jewish related exhibitions, the first exhibition presents 300 years of Jewish history of The Hague and was open during the yearly Hanukkah celebration.

On January 14, 2016, the Ashkenazi Chief Rabbi of Israel, David Lau, placed a mezuzah at the centre, marking the official opening of CHAJ.

External links
 Joods Den Haag
 CHAJ on Facebook

References

Jewish Community Center
Organizations established in 2015
Organisations based in The Hague
Buildings and structures in The Hague
2015 establishments in the Netherlands
Jews and Judaism in the Netherlands
Jewish organizations established in 2015
Yiddish culture in the Netherlands
21st-century architecture in the Netherlands